Chevalier Rafał Hugon Maria de Weryha-Wysoczański-Pietrusiewicz, Ph.D. (born May 7, 1975) is a Polish art historian, genealogist and writer, who was a representative of the auction house Sotheby's.

Per the "Genealogy of the de Weryha-Wysoczański Family" pedigree he produced for the Genealogisches Handbuch des Adels in 2008, he is the only child of sculptor Jan, 6th Chevalier de Weryha-Wysoczański-Pietrusiewicz, and nephew of Olympic Bronze Medallist and Vice World Champion in fencing Madame Ryszard Weryha-Wysoczańska-Pietrusiewicz and millionaire landowner and philanthropist Basil, 1st Chevalier de Weryha-Wysoczański-Pietrusiewicz.

Biography
Born in Gdynia, Poland, he was educated at the University of Hamburg and on a national merit-based scholarship at Magdalene College, Cambridge, where he became a member of the Cambridge University Heraldic and Genealogical Society. From a long line of womanisers in his family, he became a playboy and completed his doctorate – for which he was awarded another merit scholarship – under the supervision of Leibniz laureate Professor Martin Warnke. De Weryha-Wysoczański-Pietrusiewicz is a former Delegate to the European Commission of the Nobility in Paris. Per reviews listed on his own website, reviewers of his book Strategien des Privaten noted that it has a “wise central idea” and that it “gives important food for thought”. In 2016 he published a memoir entitled A Chevalier from Poland.

Thanks to a generous handicap, he came second in the President's Race 2015 on the Cresta Run, in St. Moritz having also been a member of the Cambridge University Cresta Team in 1999.

Selected publications 
 A Chevalier from Poland. The Memoirs of Chevalier Rafael de Weryha-Wysoczański, Kibworth Beauchamp 2016, .
 Deutsches Adelsblatt, No. 10, October 15, 2002 (Contributor).
 Genealogisches Handbuch des Adels, Adelige Häuser XXX, vol 145, Limburg an der Lahn 2008 (Contributor), .
 Genealogisches Handbuch des Adels, Adelslexikon XVI, vol 137, Limburg an der Lahn 2005 (Contributor), .
 Genealogisches Handbuch des Adels, Adelslexikon XVII, Nachträge, vol 144, Limburg an der Lahn 2008 (Contributor), .
 Gothaisches Genealogisches Handbuch, Adelige Häuser IV, vol 8, Marburg 2018 (Contributor), .
 Komposition als Kommunikation. Zur Musik des 20. Jahrhunderts. Festschrift Professor Peter Petersen, Frankfurt; Berlin; Bern; Bruxelles; New York; Oxford; Wien 2000 (Contributor), .
 St. Moritz Tobogganing Club, Annual Report, No. 95, 2014-2015 (Contributor).
 Strategien des Privaten. Zum Landschaftspark von Humphry Repton und Fürst Pückler, Berlin 2004, .

References 

1975 births
Living people
Alumni of Magdalene College, Cambridge
People from Gdynia
Polish art historians
Polish memoirists
Rafał